Stainmore, for administrative purposes, is a civil parish in the Eden District, Cumbria, England.  The parish contains ten listed buildings that are recorded in the National Heritage List for England.  All the listed buildings are designated at Grade II, the lowest of the three grades, which is applied to "buildings of national importance and special interest".  The parish is almost completely rural, containing only a few small settlements.  The listed buildings consist of a farmhouse and outbuildings, a former country house and its coach house, a public house, three boundary stones, and three milestones.


Buildings

References

Citations

Sources

Lists of listed buildings in Cumbria